Rashvanlu (also Romanized as Rashvānlū) is a village in Faruj Rural District, in the Central District of Faruj County, North Khorasan Province, Iran. At the 2006 census, its population was 618, in 153 families.

References 

Populated places in Faruj County